William Kirkpatrick may refer to:

William Kirkpatrick (East India Company officer) (1754–1812), British officer and diplomat in India, known also as an orientalist
William Kirkpatrick (New York politician) (1769–1832), United States Representative from New York
William Sebring Kirkpatrick (1844–1932), Republican member of the U.S. House of Representatives from Pennsylvania
William J. Kirkpatrick (1838–1921), American musician
William T. Kirkpatrick (1848–1921), Irish tutor and headmaster
William Kirkpatrick (British Army officer) (1852–1931), British Army officer
William Huntington Kirkpatrick (1885–1970), Republican member of the U.S. House of Representatives from Pennsylvania
William Kirkpatrick (Conservative politician) (1878–1953), British Conservative Party politician, MP 1931–1936
William Kirkpatrick (Scottish MP) (c. 1705–1778), Member of Parliament for Dumfries Burghs, 1735–1738